Abdullah Khan (born 1933) is a Pakistani sprinter. He competed in the men's 400 metres at the 1956 Summer Olympics.

References

1933 births
Living people
Athletes (track and field) at the 1956 Summer Olympics
Pakistani male sprinters
Pakistani male middle-distance runners
Olympic athletes of Pakistan
Place of birth missing (living people)
20th-century Pakistani people